Bridge of Spain may refer to:

 Pont d'Espagne, a bridge in the French Pyrenees
 Puente de España, a bridge in Manila, Philippines